Qari Bridge is a historic stone bridges in Tabriz, Iran, over the Quri River. It has been built during Qajar dynasty, and is a part of Seghat-ol-eslam street, connecting Bazaar of Tabriz to the northern districts of Tabriz, among them Sheshgelan and Davachi. During Pahlavi dynasty, a smaller bridge was built for the pedestrians.

References

External links

 https://web.archive.org/web/20120226205859/http://www.eachto.ir/

Buildings and structures in Tabriz
Architecture in Iran
Bridges in Iran
Transportation in East Azerbaijan Province